City of Fallen Angels is the fourth book in The Mortal Instruments series by Cassandra Clare. The series was meant to end with City of Glass; it was announced in March 2010 that a fourth book would be added, with Cassandra Clare later saying that she views this as a "second trilogy" in the series. The book was released on April 5, 2011.

Plot
Simon receives an offer from a vampire named Camille Belcourt, who claims to have been usurped by Raphael Santiago. She says that if Simon joins her side as the Daylighter, he will finally earn his place in the vampire society. After his meeting, he returns home worried about what his mother would think, as she has been suspicious since he went to Idris in City of Glass and did not return for a few days. Although Magnus Bane erased memories of his absence, she was still subconsciously suspicious about his whereabouts.

Simon is attacked several times. Each time, the Mark of Cain placed on him by Clary works, and anyone who tries to attack him quickly meets a biblical "sevenfold" death. 
When he arrives home, his mother confronts him about the blood she has found hidden in his closet, and he is forced to tell her what he has become. She believes that he is no longer her son and begins to pray. Desperate, he tells her that it's a bad dream and she, surprisingly, believes him, with the help of his persuasion powers as a vampire. Knowing that he can't go back to his mother's house, he moves in with his band's new member, Jordan Kyle. When Jace comes to Simon's apartment, he meets Kyle and realizes that Kyle is, in fact, a werewolf.

Meanwhile, Jace has been having dreams in which he murders Clary, which makes Jace want to avoid her. This makes Clary worry what is going on between them. Clary and her mother Jocelyn also discover that someone is trying to create more demonic children like Sebastian when they see a baby with clawed hands and black eyes at the hospital.

At one of Simon's band's concerts, Simon runs off stage, ill from lack of blood consumption. Maureen, a fourteen-year-old, follows Simon and asks for his picture. Simon bites her and drinks her blood but is thankfully interrupted by Kyle. At the concert, after the incident with Maureen, Simon is confronted by Maia and Isabelle. They are furious at him, as he never told either of them that he was dating both of them. Halfway through the argument, Kyle shows up. Before he can say anything, Maia recognizes and attacks him, only to be stopped by Simon and Isabelle. It turns out that Kyle is actually Maia's ex-boyfriend who turned her into a werewolf.

The day after that, they receive a message saying someone was holding Simon's girlfriend hostage, and he should go save her. Calling up Clary, Isabelle, and Maia, Simon determines it's a joke, only to later find the caller was actually referring to Maureen, who would always claim to be Simon's girlfriend at concerts. Maureen is killed when Simon fails to save her.

Clary then goes to the Church of Talto and fights a Hydra demon with the help of Isabelle. Later, Jace and Clary share an intimate moment in one of the spare rooms in the Institute. On the point of taking a further step in their relationship, Jace injures Clary with a knife. Jace breaks down and admits that he's been having nightmares and that was the reason he was avoiding Clary. Clary then offers to take him to the Silent City to get help from the Silent Brothers.

The Silent Brothers explain that the nightmares are due to his vulnerability to demonic influence, after Jace was resurrected by the angel Raziel. All Shadowhunters are subject to a ritual to protect them as infants. As Jace died, it was like he had been reborn without the protection. The Brothers want to perform the ritual again to give him the protection. The Silent Brothers make Clary leave. In his cell, Jace realizes that he is having a dream that he is back in Idris. Max appears to Jace and says the dreams mean that Jace is actually hurting Clary. Jace cuts his arms after Max convinces Jace that he will destroy the rotten part of him. With his blood, Max, who is actually the demon Lilith, draws a rune on his chest which puts him under Lilith's influence.

Jocelyn and Luke, now engaged, hold an engagement party. Clary disappears after being kidnapped by Jace to which no one else knows about yet. He had lied to Clary about leaving the Silent Brothers early. Jace tells Clary about a rune that binds them to one another forever. Clary accepts and hands him her stele. He begins to draw a rune, but Clary finds out too late that this is not the rune he told her about as she begins to lose consciousness with Jace catching her and carrying her away. 
Simon also disappears from the party. He is led away from the party by Maureen, now a vampire, and is taken to Lilith, who has been alive since the beginning of time. She had turned up at one of Simon's band's concerts and introduced herself as a promoter called Satrina. She explains that she needs him to bring Sebastian back from the dead. When he tells her that he cannot bring the dead back to life, she tells him that he had had that power ever since he became a Daylighter. In order to persuade him to resurrect Sebastian, she had possessed Jace and ordered him to kidnap Clary. Jace brings Clary to Lilith, and she orders him to kill Clary if Simon does not resurrect Sebastian. Simon reluctantly bites Sebastian and drains some of his blood.

Isabelle, Alec, Maia, and Jordan follow Simon to the address on Satrina's business card they found in his wallet. When they get to the building, instead of finding Simon, they find the place that Lilith used as her nursery, with all the children dead. Every one of them had clawed hands and black eyes, like that one Clary and her mom saw at the hospital. The babies were the outcome of Lilith trying to make half-demon children like Sebastian. While going through the room, Isabelle discovers a mother of one of the babies, who then explains to them what happened.

Meanwhile, Clary tricks Jace by saying she does not wish to watch and he embraces her. She then grabs Jace's knife and cuts the rune that Lilith is using to possess him on his chest, causing Jace to be freed from Lilith's control. Jace tells Clary to run away and believes that she did, but then Lilith reveals that Clary stayed and starts torturing her with a whip. Jace tells Lilith that he'll do what she wants if she lets Clary go, but Lilith wants and intends to torture Clary to madness. The third time that she goes to hit Clary, Simon kills Lilith by throwing himself between Lilith and Clary, so Lilith hits Simon (instead of Clary), inflicting the Mark of Cain on herself. The Clave appears at the scene, and Isabelle goes downstairs to tell them the story of what happened, while Jace is waiting for them upstairs. Jace and Clary share an intimate moment on the roof. Jace is ashamed of his actions despite literally having no control over himself. Clary tells him that she loves him no matter what happens and the two share a kiss. She then goes down to the lobby to meet her mother, Luke, Simon, Maia, Alec, Magnus, and Isabelle, promising to come back in five minutes.

It concludes with Jace's rune healing, hearing Sebastian's voice in his head, and with Sebastian now in control of Jace, Jace is forced to finish the awakening ritual on Sebastian, who is now wholly and fully alive.

Reception
The Manila Bulletin gave a mixed review, writing that, "when it departs from Simon's story is when it is at its most weakest". Common Sense Media gave the book four stars and wrote "Exciting entry in bestselling series has creepy cult stuff."

References

2011 fantasy novels
American fantasy novels
2011 American novels
Margaret K. McElderry books